Withering Roses is a 1914 American silent film directed by Harry A. Pollard. It stars Margarita Fischer and Pollard.

It is a lost film.

In addition to Pollard and Fischer, the cast included Joseph Harrisk, Adelaide Bronti, Kathie Discher, and Fred Gamble.

Reception 
Pictures and the Picturegoer called it "a 'beauty' film which strikes an entirely new note in film production." The Moving Picture World said ""it fails to convince as a picture of life, but as a fairy tale it will get by and perhaps please many."

References

External links 

1914 films
American silent films
Lost American films
1910s American films